Conwil was a railway station near the village of Cynwyl Elfed in Carmarthenshire, Wales, serving the hamlet and the rural locale. It was once a thriving railway station, transporting both passenger traffic and locally produced goods, including wool, livestock, milk and timber.

History
The Teifi Valley Railway was originally operated by the Carmarthen and Cardigan Railway between Carmarthen and Cynwyl Elfed. In 1864, the line was extended to Pencader and Llandysul. The line was purchased by the Great Western Railway (GWR).

Although passenger services ceased in 1965, goods services continued until 1973 because of the milk train services to the Co-operative Group creamery at Newcastle Emlyn. As of 2012 the station and platforms still survive.

The Gwili Railway or Rheilffordd Ager y Gwili

A group of railway enthusiasts bought eight miles of the old trackbed. In neighbouring Bronwydd, a 1 mile long section of the line was reopened in spring 1978 for tourists and named the Gwili Railway. The Gwili Railway aims to eventually restore the railway as far north as Llanpumsaint. Plans were underway in 2012 to extend the line southwards to the site of Abergwili Junction. Seven derelict bridges crossing the Gwili lie between Conwyl itself and Llanpumpsaint; the cost of restoring them is a major factor delaying the reopening of the line up to Llanpumpsaint.)

Notes

References
 
 Holden, John S. Holden (2007). The Manchester & Milford Railway. The Oakwood Press. .

External links
The Gwili Railway

Railway stations in Great Britain opened in 1860
Railway stations in Great Britain closed in 1965
Disused railway stations in Carmarthenshire
Former Great Western Railway stations
Beeching closures in Wales
1860 establishments in Wales
1978 disestablishments in Wales